Numbulwar Airport  is located  west of Numbulwar, Northern Territory, Australia

References

Airports in the Northern Territory